Derek Kirk Kim is a Korean-American writer, director, and artist. He is the recipient of the Eisner (2004), the Harvey (2004), and the Ignatz Award (2003) for his debut graphic novel Same Difference and Other Stories. (The contents of which were originally serialized on his website, formerly known as Lowbright, and Small Stories). This collection of short stories was first published with the help of a 2002 Xeric Award. 

In television, he is best known for his work as a director on the Disney animated television series Amphibia. 

He was also the lead character designer of Adventure Time (Cartoon Network) and a story artist for Green Eggs and Ham (Netflix). He is also the writer of TUNE and the writer and director of the spin-off webseries, Mythomania. Kim has also worked on numerous animated shorts, including "Sympathy for Slenderman," a Webby Award nominee in 2014.

Early life
Kim was born in Gumi, Gyeongsangbuk-do, South Korea. He came to the United States when he was eight. He considers himself fortunate to have received formal training in the visual arts and in the craft of writing. He now lives in Los Angeles, California.

Career

Kim had begun serializing Healing Hands, his follow-up to Same Difference, on his website Lowbright, until he decided to abort the project on July 16, 2006. Healing Hands was to be published as a print graphic novel by First Second Books. Same Difference and Other Stories has been translated in French and is published in France and distributed in that country and Belgium, Switzerland and Canada by the publisher 6 pieds sous terre. It has also been translated into Korean, Spanish, German, and Italian.

He appeared in Adventures Into Digital Comics, a 2006 documentary on the comics industry.

Kim followed this with numerous anthology contributions and collaborations. He illustrated a story in the original Fables graphic novel 1001 Nights of Snowfall and worked for Nickelodeon magazine. He also contributed the short story, "Maiden and the River Spirit" to the first volume of the Flight series. In 2007, Kim wrote a YA graphic novel for DC Comic's Minx imprint called "Good As Lily," illustrated by Jesse Hamm. In April 2009, he illustrated "The Eternal Smile: Three Stories" — a collaboration with Gene Luen Yang — which garnered Kim his second Eisner Award, this time for "Best Short Story."

He also wrote a comic called TUNE, illustrated by Les McClaine after the first ten chapters. The first volume in this ongoing sci-fi/comedy series, Tune: Vanishing Point, was published by First Second Books and released in 2012. The second volume, Tune: Still Life, was released in 2013. The last update to the site for the comic was made in March 2013.

In March 2011, Kim debuted as a filmmaker with the release of "Raina Lee Vs. The Infinite Garage," a documentary short. In July 2011, he debuted the 1st episode of "Mythomania," which he wrote and directed. This comedy webseries about a group of aspiring cartoonists is partially drawn from Kim's real life experiences early in his career as a fledgling cartoonist.

Kim also works extensively in animation. Most recently as a director of Amphibia for Disney, and as a storyboard artist for "Green Eggs and Ham", a Netflix show produced by Warner Brother premiering late 2019. His previous credits include "Adventure Time," "Axe Cop," "Golan The Insatiable," "Major Lazer," "Lucas Bros Moving Company" and "High School USA." The animated short, "Sympathy for Slenderman" for which Kim contributed character and background designs was nominated for a Webby Award in 2014.

References 

Bengal, et alia. Flight: Volume One. Image Comics, 2004.
Brownstein, Charles. "Tape This to Your Cubicle Wall". The Comics Journal No. 240. January 2002 ("The year in review")
Butcher, Chris. A little bit about Mainstream Publishing. Jan. 13, 2009. accessed Jan. 15, 2009.
Garrity, Shaenon.  "Two Skills in Tandem", The Webcomics Examiner, September 2004
George, William, et al.  "Derek Kirk Kim: A Critics Roundtable", The Webcomics Examiner, September 2004
Kim, Derek Kirk.  Same Difference & Other Stories. Top Shelf Productions, 2004
Lyden, Jacki. "Graphic Novelist with a Comic Sensibility". National Public Radio.

External links

The Eternal Smile Wins Eisner Prize, from Hyphen Magazine

1974 births
Living people
Alternative cartoonists
American comics artists
American comics writers
American writers of Korean descent
Eisner Award winners for Talent Deserving of Wider Recognition
American graphic novelists
Harvey Award winners for Best New Talent
People from Gumi, North Gyeongsang
People from North Gyeongsang Province
South Korean emigrants to the United States